Charles Boynton may refer to:
Charles Lawrence Boynton (1864–1943), American botanist
Charles Albert Boynton (1867–1954), U.S. federal judge
Charles B. Boynton (1806–1883), president of Howard University and chaplain of the United States House of Representatives
Charles F. Boynton (1906–1999), bishop of the Episcopal Diocese of Puerto Rico
 Charles Boynton Knapp (born 1946), president of the University of Georgia